"You've Got to Earn It" is a 1964 song recorded by the Temptations for the Gordy (Motown) label. It was released as the B-side to their 1965 Top 40 hit "Since I Lost My Baby", and was also able to chart on its own, peaking at number 23 on the Billboard Bubbling Under Hot 100 Pop Charts. On Billboards R&B singles chart, "You've Got to Earn It" peaked at number 22. It was written by Miracles lead singer Smokey Robinson, who also was the song’s producer, and the group’s main guitarist, Cornelius Grant. Grant did not play guitar on the song as he was out on tour during the recording session.

Cash Box described it as a "rhythmic, hand-clappin’ happy-go-lucky romancer."

Personnel
 Lead vocals by Eddie Kendricks
 Background vocals by Melvin Franklin, Paul Williams, David Ruffin, and Otis Williams
 Instrumentation by the Funk Brothers

Chart history

Notes

1964 songs
1965 singles
The Temptations songs
Songs written by Smokey Robinson
Songs written by Cornelius Grant
Gordy Records singles
Song recordings produced by Smokey Robinson